This list of Ports and harbours in Sudan details the ports, harbours around the coast of Sudan.

List of ports and harbours in Sudan

External links

References

Ports

Sudan